"Next Thing Smokin'" is a song co-written and recorded by American country music artist Joe Diffie.  It was released in August 1992 as the third single from the album Regular Joe.  The song reached #16 on the Billboard Hot Country Singles & Tracks chart.  The song was written by Diffie, Danny Morrison and Johnny Slate.

Critical reception
Deborah Evans Price of Billboard gave the song a positive review, saying that Diffie "keeps strong vocal tempo with a tune of hot pickin', fiddlin', and piano ticklin'."

Chart performance
The song debuted at number 60 on the Hot Country Singles & Tracks chart dated August 7, 1992. It charted for 20 weeks on that chart, reaching its peak of number 16 on the chart dated October 17, 1992, making it Diffie's first single to miss the Top 10 on the country charts.

Charts

References

1992 singles
Joe Diffie songs
Songs written by Joe Diffie
Songs written by Danny Morrison (songwriter)
Songs written by Johnny Slate
Song recordings produced by Bob Montgomery (songwriter)
Epic Records singles
1992 songs